John Jackson (7 January 1923 – June 1992) was an English footballer who played in the Football League for Stoke City.

Career
Jackson was born in Newcastle-under-Lyme and played amateur football with Alsager Town before joining Stoke City in 1946. He scored three goals in three matches in 1946–47 but failed to gain a regular place in Bob McGrory's starting eleven and after one more appearance in the next campaign he returned to amateur football with Congleton Town.

Career statistics

References

English footballers
Congleton Town F.C. players
Stoke City F.C. players
English Football League players
1923 births
1992 deaths
Alsager Town F.C. players
Association football forwards